Rhododendron albrechtii is a species of flowering plant in the family Ericaceae. It is endemic to Japanese temperate rainforests. Native of central and northern Japan; described from specimens collected in the 1860s by Michael Albrecht of the Russian Consulate at Hakodate, for whom the species is named.

Description
Rhododendron albrechtii is a deciduous shrub growing up to 4 feet tall. The leaves often arranged in clusters of five. Pink and magenta flowers bloom in early spring in clusters of three to five.

Distribution and habitat
Rhododendron albrechtii thrives in cold, sub-alpine zones in the rainforests of Honshu and Hokkaido. It is cultivated in Europe.

Ecology
This rhododendron seems to prefer woodland conditions.

References

albrechtii
Flora of Japan
Plants described in 1871